Athiran is a 2019 Indian Malayalam-language psychological thriller film directed by Vivek and scripted by P. F. Mathews from a story by Vivek. It was produced by Raju Mathew through his production company Century Investments. The film stars Fahadh Faasil with Sai Pallavi, Atul Kulkarni, Renji Panicker, Shanthi Krishna and Sudev Nair in pivotal roles while Prakash Raj makes a cameo appearance. The film features original songs composed by debutant P. S. Jayhari and a musical score by Ghibran. The story is set in a psychiatric asylum.The film has similarities with the 2010 Hollywood film Shutter Island (film)

Principal photography began in November 2018 was completed in January 2019 in a 55-day shoot, extensively shot in Ooty. The film was released on 12 April 2019 two days before the Vishu holiday.

Plot

Back in 1967, Lakshmi arrives home to witness her niece, Nithya, playing with a piece of thread, having been completely dissociated from reality, while surrounded by the dead bodies of her family members. Her mental state and reaction upon glancing at her aunt lead us to believe that she is the killer.

The story then shifts to an eerie mental asylum set in the wilderness 5 years later where Dr. Kannan Nair, a psychiatrist, has come to inspect the place. We are introduced to the 5 resident patients, Renuka the caretaker, and Dr. Benjamin, who is the main doctor and also the owner.

Upon meeting Dr. Benjamin, Dr. Nair is upset about the whole setup of the asylum and continues to question Benjamin's integrity as a doctor. Dr Benjamin says he will make Dr. Nair see how good of a psychiatrist he is by hypnotizing him. Dr. Nair notices that although there are only five patients on the records, there seems to be a sixth patient, Nithya (who happened to be chained in a cell hidden away from the public's eye). Dr. Nair demands to see her, accusing Dr. Benjamin of using primitive, illogical, and illegal treatment methods. Dr. Benjamin states that Nithya is his daughter and that he has her locked away because she is too dangerous.

Dr. Nair proceeds to visit Nithya in her cell, entering despite the guard's warning to not do so, Nithya appears as a scary and sinister person, almost ghoulish. Nithya, upon spotting an intruder in her space, hits Nair and he falls unconscious on the cell floor. He wakes up in his room hours later. 

Nair records his day's findings on his voice recorder and decides to explore the place a bit. Renuka had previously mentioned that the asylum is so big and with so many corridors and rooms that even she hasn't explored all of it yet. He comes upon a door that opens to a tunnel, at the end of which he discovers Lakshmi locked in a cell. She tells the Nair to somehow rescue Nithya from this place. After coming out of the strange tunnel, he goes into Dr. Benjamin's room to escape from a security guard who was patrolling the corridors. There, he comes upon a diary that was hidden under the doctor's study.

The next day, Dr. Nair leads Nithya out of her room, settling her in with the other patients, to live among them. When Dr Benjamin questions this act, Dr. Nair mocks him and says autism (Nithya's diagnosis) is not a mental illness requiring confinement. 

Dr Nair reads the diary he found from Dr. Benjamin's desk and it reveals Nithya's history to the viewer. We see her father is not Benjamin, but Jaya Narayana Varma, a royal from Nadakkal Kovilakam. We see that Varma loved his daughter and refused to believe she was mentally disabled, treating her just like a normal child. When he discovers her perfect reflexes, he teaches her kalari, a martial art form native to Kerala. Nithya was brought to Benjamin by Lakshmi after the murders in their family. She asks him to treat Nithya and look her after as his own daughter. While Nair was reading the diary, standing in front of a dock, he slips into the water and the hospital guard ends up saving him. Dr. Nair believes he was pushed by someone. Nair tries to escape from the place at night with some medical documents, but is chased by the guard dogs and watchman suspecting him to be an intruder. These acts of assault lead him to believe that Benjamin is trying to kill him. This suspicion is strengthened by a dialogue they share afterwards where Benjamin states that "sheep don't hunt, they are to be hunted."

After this appalling turn of events, Dr. Nair grows close to Nithya and takes her out on the hospital grounds and an obvious romance is bubbling between them. This disturbs Jeevan, another young patient who also likes Nithya. A conversation between the nurse and Dr. Benjamin (who appear to be lovers) reveals that he had erased Nithya's memories completely. Dr. Nair finds this out and tries to spark her memories by talking about her father and asking her what happened to him. Nithya starts to remember her father, her aunt Lakshmi, and her cousin Vinayan (son of Lakshmi). Dr. Nair later goes to Dr. Benjamin and tells him that he is going to take Nithya away and save her from his evil methods. Dr. Benjamin mocks him and warns him to not make promises that he can't keep.

Dr. Benjamin, suspecting Nithya's memories are returning, plans to continue his primordial methods on her. Nair searches for her, but is misled by Benjamin and chases a car that turns out to be carrying a catatonic Jeevan. Upon running back to the facility, he is helped by the patients who are all fond of Nithya and they lead him to the place where Benjamin conducts his  experiments. There ensues a fight between Nithya, Nair, and Benjamin. Nithya and Nair manage to escape by severely injuring Benjamin.

The story then proceeds to a few days later when a man claiming to be Dr. Kannan Nair visits the hospital. In a rather mind-boggling twist of events, it is revealed that he is the original Dr. Nair and the imposter was actually Vinayan, Nithya's cousin. It turns out Vinayan was a patient of Dr. Nair and has schizophrenia with delusions and all of its psychotic elements.

Here we are shown various scenes from the movie that prove this. There was no real Lakshmi imprisoned in the hospital, it was all a figment of Vinayan's hallucinations: Lakshmi died a few years after admitting Nithya to the asylum. Vinayan plunged himself into the water while reading the diary, his paranoia making him believe someone pushed him. We see his growing anger and lack of professionalism, his attempts to get close to Nithya, and his over-protectiveness towards Nithya as a visiting psychiatrist, and more.

The real Dr. Nair censures Dr. Benjamin for his lack of insight into interpersonal relationships despite being a psychiatrist. He mocks the staff's inability to spot someone as mentally unstable as Vinayan in those three days,  and is stunned by the fact that they didn't even ask Vinayan for any proof of identity. He explains to them that Vinayan was a sociopathic child who was also trained by Nithya's father. During treatment, Vinayan was able to maintain his veneer of sanity under medication and later admitted thereafter the 4 murders he committed. 

It is revealed to the audience that it was not Nithya who murdered her family, but Vinayan. Nithya's father was actually murdered by his brothers, and the boy killed them in revenge and to stop them from harming Nithya. The cousins were actually promised to each other by Varma before his tragic death, and the voice-over states that they are both very close to each other and will do anything to keep the other safe. 

The film ends with the real Dr. Nair swearing that he will catch Vinayan wherever he is hiding. We then see that Vinayan and Nithya are happily living together in a beautiful house on the hills at peace, finally free from the external world.

Cast
Fahadh Faasil as  Vinayan, Nithya's cousin turned husband, Lakshmi's son
Sai Pallavi as Nadakkal Kovilakatthu Karthika Thirunaal Nithya Lakshmi alias "Nithya" , Vinayan's cousin turned wife, Jayanarayana Varma's daughter (The Mute Girl)
Atul Kulkarni as Dr. Benjamin Diaz
Renji Panicker as Nadakkal Kovilakatthu Jaya Narayana Varma, Nithya's father and Vinayan's uncle
Sudev Nair as Jeevan Thomas, Nithya mental asylum friend. Love her as one side
Shanthi Krishna as Nadakkal Kovilakatthu Lakshmi, Vinayan's mother, Nithya's aunt and Jayanarayana Varma's sister
Lena as Renuka, Dr. Benjamin's secret girlfriend
Nandhu as Avarachan
Leona Lishoy as Anna Maria
Surabhi Lakshmi as Vadakkedath Kamala Lakshmi
Vijay Menon as Professor P. Subrahmanya Iyer
Prakash Raj as "Real" Dr. M. K. Nair (Cameo)

Production
Title of the film was announced on 17 February 2019 alongside the first official poster. Athiran marks the directorial debut of Vivek. According to Vivek, the story was formed based on a real-life account combined with inspiration from a short story written by Edgar Allan Poe. He said: "the story idea came up after I went to a Kalari school in Thrippunithura, Kerala, where autistic students were performing with the same prowess as the school's other students". The screenplay was written by P. F. Mathews. When Vivek briefed the story idea to Faasil two-and-a-half years ago, it was Faasil who introduced him Mathews. Vivek himself titled the film. Vivek cites Ulladakkam, Sesham, and Devadoothan as the major inspirations for the film, and were also inspired by Shutter Island, A Cure for Wellness, and Stonehearst Asylum.

Principal photography began in November 2018. The film was extensively shot in Ooty, Tamil Nadu. Filming was completed on 21 January 2019. It took 55 days to complete the filming process. The film is set in a psychiatric facility.

Music

The film score was composed by Ghibran, the film marks his Malayalam cinema debut. The film features three songs composed by debutant P. S. Jayhari, who was supposed to debut with the same director's shelved film Aanenkilum Allenkilum. The lyrics were written by Vinayak Sasikumar and Engandiyoor Chandrasekharan. The soundtrack album was released by Manorama Music.

Release
The film was released on 12 April 2019.

Critical reception
Rating 4 out of 5 stars, Sajin Srijith of The New Indian Express called the movie an Impressive, emotionally rewarding psychological thriller. Filmibeat.com rated it 3.5 and written, "Athiran isn't a routine entertainer but it remarkably keeps us hooked with the intelligence in the narrative. It definitely offers a unique experience for Malayalam movie audiences."

Sify has reviewed that the film is an engaging psycho thriller and rated 3/5. Deccan Chronicle rated the movie 3/5 Stars and stated, "It is a onetime watch for those who like psychological thrillers with some mind-bending and adrenaline rush moments."

The Times of India reviewer Anna Mathews rated it 2.5/5 and stated "While the film has thrills and is a venture with a difference, it lacks in some heft. There is a 'thrills for the sake of thrills' feel to the movie. But if you are in the mood for a adrenalin rush, 'Athiran' won't disappoint." S. R. Praveen of The Hindu reviewed the film as an enticing movie that falls short of expectations.

Box office
The film grossed $194,952 in the United Arab Emirates in the opening weekend (the second best opener of that weekend, behind Avengers: Endgame) and $255,663 in four weeks. In the opening weekend, it grossed $1,358 from two theatres in the United Kingdom, $14,230 (₹9.92 lakh) from 43 screens in the United States and $321 (₹22,372) from 2 screens in Canada. It collected $18,974 (₹13.17 lakh) in the US in three weeks.

References

External links
 

Films about autism
2019 directorial debut films
2019 films
2010s Malayalam-language films
Indian psychological thriller films
Films set in psychiatric hospitals
Films shot in Ooty
Films about disability in India
2019 psychological thriller films
2010s romantic thriller films
Indian romantic thriller films